Milan Gvero (Serbian Cyrillic: Милан Гверо) (4 December 1937 – 17 February 2013) was a Bosnian Serb Army (VRS/Army of Republika Srpska) general sentenced to five years in jail by the International Criminal Tribunal for the former Yugoslavia (ICTY) on charges of war crimes and crimes against humanity committed during the Bosnian War of 1992–95.

In response to President Radovan Karadžić's attempt to remove Ratko Mladić as commander of the VRS in early August 1995, General Gvero detained Karadžić for a day in the last week of August, and berated him for his hostility to Mladić and the army high command.

On 17 February 2013, Gvero died at the Military Medical Academy in Belgrade, aged 75, from undisclosed causes.

References

Army of Republika Srpska soldiers
Serbs of Bosnia and Herzegovina
People indicted by the International Criminal Tribunal for the former Yugoslavia
People convicted by the International Criminal Tribunal for the former Yugoslavia
Serbs of Bosnia and Herzegovina convicted of war crimes
Serbs of Bosnia and Herzegovina convicted of crimes against humanity
1937 births
2013 deaths